Linn Lake is a lake in Chisago County, Minnesota, in the United States.

Linn Lake was named for a family who settled there.

See also
List of lakes in Minnesota

References

Lakes of Minnesota
Lakes of Chisago County, Minnesota